Clifford Earle Young (December 7, 1883 – August 21, 1958) was a general authority of the Church of Jesus Christ of Latter-day Saints (LDS Church) from 1941 until his death.

Young was born in Salt Lake City, Utah Territory, the son of LDS Church leader Seymour B. Young. From 1905 to 1908, he served as a Mormon missionary in England and Germany. In 1928, Young became the president of the Alpine Stake of the LDS Church in Utah. In 1934, he joined the Mormon Tabernacle Choir.

In 1941, Young became one of the first five individuals selected as Assistants to the Quorum of the Twelve Apostles. Young served in this position until his death in Salt Lake City.

Young was married to Edith Grant, a daughter of LDS Church president Heber J. Grant.

References

External links
Grampa Bill's G.A. Pages: Clifford E. Young

1883 births
1958 deaths
20th-century Mormon missionaries
American Mormon missionaries in England
American Mormon missionaries in Germany
American general authorities (LDS Church)
Assistants to the Quorum of the Twelve Apostles
Burials in Utah
Latter Day Saints from Utah
People from Salt Lake City
Richards–Young family
Tabernacle Choir members